Crisuliporidae is a family of bryozoans belonging to the order Cyclostomatida.

Genera:
 Crisulipora Robertson, 1910

References

Cyclostomatida